Mitchel Paulissen (born 21 April 1993) is a Dutch professional footballer who plays as an attacking midfielder for Cambuur in the Eredivisie. He formerly played for Roda JC and on loan for VVV-Venlo.

Career
Ahead of the 2019–20 season, Paulissen joined Cambuur on a free transfer, signing a two-year deal. The deal was confirmed on 30 May 2019.

References

External links
 
 

1993 births
Living people
Dutch footballers
Association football midfielders
Roda JC Kerkrade players
VVV-Venlo players
SC Cambuur players
Eredivisie players
Eerste Divisie players
Sportspeople from Kerkrade
Footballers from Limburg (Netherlands)